Otto Hoynck (1630, The Hague – after 1706), was a Dutch Golden Age portrait painter active in England.

Biography
According to the RKD he was trained in The Hague as a pupil of Arnold van Ravesteyn and Pieter Hermansz Verelst (Verelst became his father-in-law).
He moved to England after  being registered in Amsterdam in 1686.
Jacob Campo Weyerman listed him as Otto Hoijink.

References

1630 births
1706 deaths
Dutch Golden Age painters
Dutch male painters
Artists from The Hague